

This is a list of the National Register of Historic Places listings in Los Angeles County, California.

This is intended to be a complete list of the properties and districts on the National Register of Historic Places in Los Angeles County, California, excluding the cities of Los Angeles and Pasadena. The locations of National Register properties and districts for which the latitude and longitude coordinates are included below, may be seen in an online map.

There are 590 properties and districts listed on the National Register in the county, including 21 National Historic Landmarks.  Los Angeles is the location of more than 250 of these properties and districts, including 11 National Historic Landmarks; they are listed separately.  Pasadena is the location of 128 of these properties and districts, including 5 National Historic Landmarks; they, too, are listed separately.  The 194 properties and districts located elsewhere in the county, including 5 National Historic Landmarks, are listed here.  A single district, the Arroyo Seco Parkway Historic District, passes through both cities and other parts of the county.  Another 6 properties, including 5 outside these two cities, were once listed on the National Register but have been removed.

Current listings

|}

Former listings

|}

See also

List of National Historic Landmarks in California
National Register of Historic Places listings in California
California Historical Landmarks in Los Angeles County, California

References

Los Angeles